Gassaway is a town in Braxton County, West Virginia,  United States. The population was 769 at the 2020 census. Gassaway was incorporated in 1905 and named for Henry Gassaway Davis, the Democratic Party's nominee for Vice President of the United States in 1904.

History
The town was originally created at the ends of two divisions of the Coal and Coke Railway, one originating in Charleston and the other originating in Elkins. Because of its central location, the area was an ideal place to build shops to facilitate the transition between the relatively flat Charleston division, which could operate with standard equipment, and the more hilly Elkins division of the Coal & Coke which required heavier engines. The town was laid out in 1904, and over the next decade, businesses and infrastructure such as hotels, a bank, stores, schools, a hospital, office buildings and churches appeared to serve the growing population. By 1915, the Coal & Coke Railway Company had completed work on a depot to facilitate passenger service to the town.  The Gassaway Depot still stands today and was listed on the National Register of Historic Places in 1994.

Geography
Gassaway is located at  (38.670712, -80.770413), along the Elk River.

Demographics

2010 census
As of the census of 2010, there were 908 people, 434 households, and 228 families living in the town. The racial makeup of the town was 98.6% White, 0.1% African American, 0.1% Native American, 0.3% Asian, and 0.9% from two or more races. Hispanic or Latino of any race were 0.1% of the population.

There were 434 households, of which 22.1% had children under the age of 18 living with them, 39.4% were married couples living together, 9.2% had a female householder with no husband present, 3.9% had a male householder with no wife present, and 47.5% were non-families. 41.0% of all households were made up of individuals, and 19.1% had someone living alone who was 65 years of age or older. The average household size was 2.09 and the average family size was 2.84.

The median age in the town was 44.5 years. 19.2% of residents were under the age of 18; 7.9% were between the ages of 18 and 24; 23.3% were from 25 to 44; 28.1% were from 45 to 64; and 21.4% were 65 years of age or older. The gender makeup of the town was 47.5% male and 52.5% female.

2000 census
As of the census of 2000, there were 901 people, 420 households, and 243 families living in the town. The population density was 741.5 inhabitants per square mile (285.1/km2). There were 506 housing units at an average density of 416.4 per square mile (160.1/km2). The racial makeup of the town was 98.34% White, 0.55% African American, 0.55% Native American, 0.11% from other races, and 0.44% from two or more races. Hispanic or Latino of any race were 1.00% of the population.

There were 420 households, out of which 21.7% had children under the age of 18 living with them, 45.2% were married couples living together, 10.0% had a female householder with no husband present, and 42.1% were non-families. 38.8% of all households were made up of individuals, and 21.7% had someone living alone who was 65 years of age or older. The average household size was 2.15 and the average family size was 2.87.

In the town, the population dispersal was 20.0% under the age of 18, 6.5% from 18 to 24, 23.3% from 25 to 44, 25.0% from 45 to 64, and 25.2% who were 65 years of age or older. The median age was 45 years. For every 100 females, there were 82.4 males. For every 100 females age 18 and over, there were 79.8 males. The median income for a household in the town was $23,009, and the median income for a family was $31,667. Males had a median income of $28,125 versus $17,396 for females. The per capita income for the town was $15,965. About 10.8% of families and 13.9% of the population were below the poverty line, including 10.9% of those under age 18 and 16.9% of those age 65 or over.

Climate
The climate in this area is characterized by hot, humid summers and generally mild to freezing winters.  According to the Köppen Climate Classification system, Gassaway has a humid subtropical climate, abbreviated "Cfa" on climate maps.

Notable person 

 Lonnie Thompson, paleoclimatologist, was born in Gassaway

References

External links
Gassaway Days celebration on the 4th of July weekend features live music, a parade, car show, and fireworks. Visit the link for a schedule of events.
 Gassaway Days - Facebook Page

Davis and Elkins family
Towns in Braxton County, West Virginia
Towns in West Virginia